Isimeme Naomi Udu (born in Raleigh, North Carolina, raised in Concord, North Carolina), known by her stage name Hemlocke Springs (stylized in all lowercase), is an American singer, songwriter, and record producer. She first gained attraction through the social media platform TikTok, from her song "Girlfriend". In May 2022, she released her debut single "Gimme All Ur Luv".

Early life 
Udu was born in Raleigh and raised in her hometown: Concord, North Carolina. She graduated from Spelman College in 2021 with a bachelor's degree in biology. She is currently getting her master's degree at Dartmouth College in Medical Informatics.

Musical career 
On May 24, 2022, Udu released her debut single: "Gimme All Ur Luv" which gained over a million streams through Spotify. The song was named as "the best bedroom pop" song by Complex.

Udu released her second single named "Girlfriend" on November 2, 2022. The song surpassed a million Spotify streams, with people calling it the "awkward Black girl anthem." Udu, in an interview with Rolling Stone, said, "I'm just happy people are listening to it." Pitchfork described the song as "an ideal rom-com song" and "channels the bratty bravado of Family Jewels-era MARINA and the springy falsetto of Kate Bush." Udu released her third single named "Stranger Danger!" on January 13, 2023. She was named one of the "essential emerging artists for 2023" by New Musical Express.

In an interview with Alternative Press, Udu came up with her stage name from a "random name generator ([and] she added the 'e' at the end of 'Hemlock' in honor of Lorde)."

Discography

Singles

Music videos

References 

1998 births
Living people
Singers from North Carolina
Songwriters from North Carolina